Wawa station is a commuter rail station on the SEPTA Regional Rail Media/Wawa Line, located adjacent to U.S. Route 1 in Middletown Township, Delaware County, Pennsylvania.  The original station was built by the West Chester and Philadelphia Railroad and later served the Pennsylvania Railroad's West Chester Branch, which finally became SEPTA's R3 line (later renamed to the "Media/Elwyn Line"). The outer section of the line, running from Elwyn to West Chester including the old Wawa station, was closed in 1986.

SEPTA restored service on the Media/Wawa Line from its prior terminus at Elwyn station to Wawa on August 21, 2022.

History

The West Chester and Philadelphia Railroad (WC&P) began constructing its rail line from Philadelphia in 1852 and reached Wawa in 1857. The remainder of the line to West Chester was completed in 1858. The WC&P merged with the Philadelphia and Baltimore Central Railroad (P&BC) in 1881, and both were controlled by the Pennsylvania Railroad.

Wawa station was originally known as the Baltimore Central Junction Station, being the northern terminus of the P&BC, later called the Octoraro Branch. This line was built by the P&BC between 1855 and 1868, and originally connected with the Columbia & Port Deposit Railroad in Maryland. Tourist operator Wawa & Concordville Railroad leased the Concordville-Wawa segment in 1967 and 1968 to operate passenger trains. Damage caused by Hurricane Agnes 1972 rendered the line unusable.

The station, and all of those west of Elwyn station, was closed in September 1986, due to deteriorating track conditions and Chester County's desire to expand facilities at Exton station on SEPTA's Paoli/Thorndale Line. Service was "temporarily suspended" at that time, with substitute bus service provided. Prior to the end of service, trains had not been through-routed to Philadelphia for many years, instead operating as a shuttle between Elwyn and West Chester. Wawa station still appeared in publicly posted tariffs while unused.

Wawa station was demolished shortly after service ended. Some concrete foundations remained, as did the concrete curb for the platform edge, and the pedestrian tunnel under the track. The pedestrian tunnel was sealed off with sheets of metal. All structures remaining on site were demolished in 2020 in order to construct the new station.

Service restoration

In the early 1990s, SEPTA began discussing the prospect of restoring commuter rail service between Elwyn and Wawa. Little was done until June 2005, when engineering and design for the resumption of rail service finally began. SEPTA initially estimated that the cost for the 3-mile extension of service would be $51 million; the estimate cited in SEPTA's 2009 Capital Budget was $80 million. The construction project will have included new track, catenary, signals, communications equipment, and crew facilities. A new station at Wawa with a large park and ride facility will also have been built.

Wawa was chosen as the new terminal due to its proximity to the heavily travelled U.S. Route 1, in addition to the headquarters of convenience store chain Wawa. The new Wawa station, which was briefly referred to as "Middletown" for its location in Middletown Township, was under construction in late 2020. The ADA-compliant station will have high level platforms, a ticket office, food service, and a parking garage. SEPTA will also construct a new railcar storage facility and crew bunker at the former Lenni station site.

Wawa station is estimated to be used by about 950 commuters on a typical weekday. The engineering phase of the terminal project began in July 2005. This included preliminary engineering, environmental impact analysis, and final engineering. Shortfalls in funding delayed completion of this phase due to the failing economy in 2008. SEPTA announced in 2015 in their "Rebuilding for the Future" project that service is expected to return to Wawa station by, at the latest, 2020. Construction will take 24 to 36 months to complete. As of May 2018, the total budget has been revised to $177,900,000 with construction being complete in 2021. As of January 2022, passenger service was expected to start in July 2022.

In an update published on Middletown Township's website, it was originally planned for all construction to be completed by June 2022, with passenger service beginning on July 1, 2022. On May 23, 2022, it was announced that the start of passenger service would be delayed until August 21, 2022, due to supply chain issues. Training and qualifying runs along the new portion of the branch were conducted throughout June and July 2022.

On July 27, 2022, SEPTA announced that convenience store chain Wawa acquired naming rights to the station for $5.4 million in a 10-year deal. A ribbon-cutting ceremony for Wawa station was held on August 18, 2022, with SEPTA and Wawa leadership in attendance including Wawa President and CEO Chris Gheysens. Following the ceremony, a train with a Wawa advertising wrap took a trip on the extension from Wawa to Elwyn. Regular service began on Sunday, August 21, 2022. On August 22, Wawa provided free celebratory coffee, pretzels, and drinks to commuters. With the opening of the station, the Media/Elwyn Line was renamed the Media/Wawa Line.

On August 29, 2022, SEPTA Suburban Bus routes 111 and 114 began onsite service to Wawa station.

References

External links

Wawa Station | SEPTA
SEPTA Elwyn to Wawa Service Restoration Project | Middletown Township

SEPTA Regional Rail stations
Stations on the West Chester Line
Railway stations in Delaware County, Pennsylvania
Railway stations closed in 1986
1986 disestablishments in Pennsylvania
Railway stations in the United States opened in 2022
2022 establishments in Pennsylvania